The  Philadelphia Eagles season was the franchise's 50th season in the National Football League (NFL). The Eagles failed to improve on their 10–6 record from 1981, and finished only 3–6 (a players' strike reduced the season to 9 games). The Eagles failed to make the playoffs for the first time since 1977.

This season would mark the end of an era under head coach Dick Vermeil. While under Vermeil the Eagles had the most successful period of their existence up to that time, making the playoffs four straight seasons (1978–1981) and having a record of 54–47 in six seasons with Vermeil (1976–1982) while making the Super Bowl in 1980. Vermeil retired after the 1982 season citing burnout, but would return to coaching in 1997 with the St. Louis Rams and would lead them to a Super Bowl victory in 1999.

Offseason

NFL draft 
After going 10–6 and losing in the NFC Wildcard game at home to the New York Giants (9–7) in the 1981 season the Eagles would be picking 20th in the 12 rounds of the draft.

The 1982 NFL Draft was the procedure by which National Football League teams selected amateur college football players. It is officially known as the NFL Annual Player Selection Meeting. The draft was held April 27–28, 1982. ESPN would cover all 12 rounds live. ESPN would then show a replay later that night.

The Philadelphia Eagles would get the 20th pick in the 12 rounds. The Eagles would draft 11 players in this year's draft.

Personnel

Staff

Roster

Regular season 
The Eagles' 1982 schedule was set based on how they finished in 1981: 2nd in the NFC East. The way it was laid out, 4 of the 5 teams in the same 5-team division could end up having 10 to 14 common opponents during the season. Also, when the last regular season game was over, each team would know which teams they would play the following year. The Eagles' 1982 schedule called for:
 A home and away series vs Dallas, New York Giants, St. Louis and Washington = 8 games.
 Each of the top 4 teams in the NFC East (based on their 1981 standings) would play the 4 teams in the AFC Central = 4 games.
 Each of the 2nd- and 3rd-place teams in the NFC East (based on their 1981 standings; i.e., the Eagles and Giants) would play the 2nd- and 3rd-place teams in the NFC Central and NFC West (also based on their 1981 standings: Lions, Packers, Falcons, and Rams) = 4 games.
Seven games were canceled due to the players' strike (at Atlanta, Dallas, Detroit, at Green Bay, at St Louis, Los Angeles Rams, and at Pittsburgh) – the latter was actually planned for Monday Night Football (the two teams have yet to meet in prime-time to this day). The game against the New York Giants originally scheduled for Monday Night Football on October 25, 1982 was moved to January 2, 1983 as the NFL created a "17th week" of the 1982 season. It was the first time the NFL played a regular season game in January.

Schedule 

Note: Intra-division opponents are in bold text.

Season summary

Week 14 at Giants

Standings

References

External links 
 1982 Philadelphia Eagles at Pro-Football-Reference.com

Philadelphia Eagles seasons
Philadelphia Eagles
Philadelphia Eagles